This is a list of Asian superheroes.

Central Asian

Kazakhstan

 Khan from Guardians

East Asian

Chinese
Aero (Marvel Comics)
Auric from Gamma Flight (Marvel Comics)
Black Widow (Monica Chang) (Marvel Comics)
Blink (from X-Men: Days of Future Past and The Gifted) (Marvel Comics)
Captain China, created by Chi Wang from Excel Comics
Cassie Chan from the Power Rangers universe
Grace Choi from the Outsiders (DC Comics)
Claw from Primal Force (DC Comics)
Collective Man (Marvel Comics)
Dr. Mirage from Valiant Comics
Dragonmage from the Legion of Super-Heroes (DC Comics)
Gloss from the New Guardians (DC Comics)
Great Ten (DC Comics)
The Green Turtle - first Asian American superhero
I Ching (DC Comics)
Jade (Jade Yifei) (DC Comics)
Jubilee from the X-Men (Marvel Comics)
Green Lantern (Kai-ro) from the Batman Beyond animated series (DC Comics)
Liu Kang from the Mortal Kombat video game series
Kato from the Green Hornet TV series (Bruce Lee)
Kwai from the Blood Syndicate (DC Comics)
Lady Shiva (DC Comics)
Lin Lie, also known as Sword Master and Iron Fist (Marvel Comics)
Lin Sun from the Sons of the Tiger (Marvel Comics)
Monkey Prince (DC Comics)
Push, a supporting character from the Spider-Girl comic book series (Marvel Comics)
New Super-Man (DC Comics)
Radioactive Man from Marvel Comics
Red Lotus (ally of the X-Men) (Marvel Comics)
Shang-Chi (Marvel Comics)
Stuff the Chinatown Kid from the Seven Soldiers of Victory
Wing from the Seven Soldiers of Victory (DC Comics) 
Wong, sidekick to Doctor Strange (Marvel Comics) 
Jimmy Woo (Marvel Comics)
Xorn from the X-Men (Marvel Comics)
Thunderlord from the Global Guardians (DC Comics)
Pandamen from the Pandamen
Swift from The Authority
Atom (Ryan Choi) (DC Comics) 
Black Mask, protagonist of a 1996 Hong Kong film
Grunge from Gen 13 (DC Comics)
Shen Kuei (a.k.a. The Cat) from Marvel Comics
Striker Z from the Power Company (DC Comics)
Sway from the X-Men (Marvel Comics)
Thunderlord from the Global Guardians
Kai Chen, the Blue Galaxy Ranger from Power Rangers Lost Galaxy
Gemma, designated as Ranger Silver from Power Rangers RPM
Battle Strike Team: Giant Saver (Battle Strike Team Series)
Battle Strike Team: Space Deleter (Battle Strike Team Series)
Battle Strike Team: Rescue Engine (Battle Strike Team Series)
Battle Strike Team: Railway Vanguard (Battle Strike Team Series)
Armor Hero (Armor Hero Series)
Armor Hero XT (Armor Hero Series)
Armor Hero Lava (Armor Hero Series)
Armor Hero Captor (Armor Hero Series)
Armor Hero Hunter (Armor Hero Series)
Armor Hero: Emperor (Armor Hero Series)
Armor Hero: Atlas (Armor Hero Series)
Armor Hero: Captor King (Armor Hero Series)
Balala the Fairies
BLimits Man
Golden Hero
Dragon Blade/Ghost Well
Dancing Baby Dofala
K-Boy
The heroes from King of Warrior EX
Azure Kaiser from Metal Kaiser
The Alien Chuanchuan (multiple)
Spin Man
Super Beast Force: Hero With Thousand Faces
Inframan
Transform Warrior Along
V Beast
Vajra Man
The Invincible Space Streaker

Japanese
Armor from the X-Men (Marvel Comics)
Aso Masaru/Kamen Rider ZO
Ben Daimio from Dark Horse Comics
Big Hero 6 from Marvel Comics
Big Science Action from DC Comics
Blitzen from the Shadow Cabinet (DC Comics)
Bushido from the Teen Titans (DC Comics)
Masaru Daisato, the protagonist from the 2007 Japanese film Big Man Japan
Eiko Hasigawa, Catwoman (DC Comics)
Esper Mami
Fuji from Stormwatch (DC Comics) 
Godai Yusuke/Kamen Rider Kuuga
GoGo Tomago from Big Hero 6
Gwenny Lou Sabuki is Golden Girl II from the Invaders (Marvel Comics)
Hazmat from the Avengers Academy (Marvel Comics) 
Hidaka Hitoshi/Kamen Rider Hibiki
Hidari Shoutarou/Kamen Rider Joker, Phillip (Sonozaki Raito)/Kamen Rider Cyclone, Shoutaro-Phillip/Kamen Rider Double
Hino Eiji/Kamen Rider OOO
Hōjō Emu/Kamen Rider Ex-Aid
Hongo Takeshi/Kamen Rider #1
Hoshi Kimiyo is Dr. Light from the Justice League (DC Comics) 
Igarashi Ikki + Vice/Kamen Rider Revice
Inui Takumi/Kamen Rider Faiz
Ishimonji Hayato/Kamen Rider #2
Jin Keisuke/Kamen Rider X
Jo Shigeru/Kamen Rider Stronger
Jolt from the Thunderbolts (Marvel Comics) 
Kabuki (Dark Horse Comics)
Katana from the Outsiders (DC Comics) 
Kazamatsuri Shin/Kamen Rider Shin
Kazuraba Kota/Kamen Rider Gaim
Kayo from Brigade (DC Comics)
Kazami Shiro/Kamen Rider V3
Kenzaki Kazuma/Kamen Rider Blade
Kido Shinji/Kamen Rider Ryuki
Kiryū Sento/Kamen Rider Build
Kisaragi Gentarou/Kamen Rider Fourze
Kodoya Tsukasa/Kamen Rider Decade
Kunoichi from DC Comics' Blackhawks
Kurenai Wataru/Kamen Rider Kiva
Kwannon from the X-Men (Marvel Comics)
 Mamachan from Sign Gene
Master Izo, ally of Daredevil (Marvel Comics) 
Matsuya Taki from the X-Terminators (Marvel Comics) 
Minami Kotarou/Kamen Rider Black/Black RX
Minoru Nico (formerly Sister Grimm) of the Runaways (Marvel Comics) 
Morita Jim from Nick Fury's Howling Commandos
Murasame Ryo/Kamen Rider ZX
Musashi from the Cadre of the Immortal
Naiad from DC Comics
Nakamura Hiro of the NBC TV series Heroes
Nakiko Akane from the Dreamwave comic book series Darkminds
Nogami Ryotarou/Kamen Rider Den-O Plat Form
Oki Kazuya/Kamen Rider Super-1
Ōgon Bat - first Asian superhero, and one of the first superheroes in general
Peni Parker
Prince of Gamma - second Asian superhero, and one of the first superheroes in general
Perman - a manga about grade school superheroes.
Radiance from the All-New Invaders (Marvel Comics) 
Ram from the New Guardians (DC Comics)
Rising Sun from the Global Guardians (DC Comics)
Sakura Spider (Marvel Comics)
Samurai from the Super Friends animated series (DC Comics)
Samurai Jack, protagonist of the Cartoon Network/Toonami animated series
Segawa Kouji/Kamen Rider J
Shamara Tako is Dragon Lord from Marvel Comics
Shinchuko Lotus from the Sons of the Tiger (Marvel Comics) 
Shouichi Tsugami/Kamen Rider Agito
Silver Samurai (Marvel Comics)
Soma Haruto/Kamen Rider Wizard
Sunburst (DC Comics)
Sunfire (Marvel Comics)
Sunpyre (Marvel Comics) 
Super Young Team from DC Comics
Surge from the X-Men (Marvel Comics)
Taki (Marvel Comics)
Takuya Yamashiro/Spider-Man/Supaidaman (Marvel Comics) 
Tendou Shouji/Kamen Rider Kabuto
Tenkūji Takeru/Kamen Rider Ghost
Tokiwa Sougo/Kamen Rider Zi-O
Tomari Shinnosuke/Kamen Rider Drive
Aruto Hiden/Kamen Rider Zero-One
Touma Kamiyama/Kamen Rider Saber
Toyman III (Hiro Okamura) (DC Comics)
Turbo from the New Warriors (Marvel Comics)
Tsukuba Hiroshi/Skyrider
Tsunami from the Young All-Stars (DC Comics) 
Ukiyo Ace/Kamen Rider Geats
Wedding Peach
Yamamoto Daisuke/Kamen Rider Amazon
Yuki Joji/Riderman
Yukio, ninja ally of the X-Men (Marvel Comics) 
Ultraman (Ultra Series)
Zoffy (Ultra Series)
Ultraseven (Ultra Series)
Ultraseven's Successor (Ultra Series)
Ultraman Jack  (Ultra Series)
Ultraman Ace  (Ultra Series)
Father of Ultra (Ultra Series)
Ultraman Taro  (Ultra Series)
Mother of Ultra (Ultra Series)
Ultraman Leo  (Ultra Series)
Astra (Ultra Series)
Ultraman King (Ultra Series)
Ultraman Joneus (Ultra Series)
Ultraman 80  (Ultra Series)
Yullian (Ultra Series)
Giant of Light (Ultra Series)
Ultraman Great  (Ultra Series)
Ultraman Powered  (Ultra Series)
Ultraman Zearth  (Ultra Series)
Ultraman Tiga  (Ultra Series)
Ultraman Dyna  (Ultra Series)
Ultraman Gaia  (Ultra Series)
Ultraman Agul  (Ultra Series)
Ultraman Nice  (Ultra Series)
Ultraman Neos  (Ultra Series)
Ultraseven 21 (Ultra Series)
Ultraman Cosmos  (Ultra Series)
Ultraman Justice (Ultra Series)
Ultraman Legend (Ultra Series)
Ultraman Nexus (Ultra Series)
Ultraman Noa (Ultra Series)
Ultraman Max (Ultra Series)
Ultraman Xenon (Ultraman Xenon)
Ultraman Mebius  (Ultra Series)
Ultraman Hikari  (Ultra Series)
Reimon (Ultra Series)
Ultraman Ginga (Ultra Series)
Jean-nine (Ultra Series)
Ultraman Victory (Ultra Series)
Ultraman Ginga Victory (Ultra Series)
Ultraman X (Ultra Series)
Ultraman Orb (Ultra Series)
Ultraman Geed (Ultra Series)
Ultraman Zero (Ultra Series)
Ultraman Rosso (Ultra Series)
Ultraman Blu (Ultra Series)
Ultraman Reube (Ultra Series)
Ultraman Grigio (Ultra Series)
Ultraman Greube (Ultra Series)
Ultraman Taiga/Titus/Fuma/Reiga (Ultra Series)
Ultraman Ribut (Ultra Series)
Ultraman Z (Ultra Series)
Ultraman Trigger (Ultra Series)
Ultraman Decker (Ultra Series)
Jigglus Juggler (Ultra Series)
Ultraman The Next (Ultra Series)
Ultraman Saga (Ultra Series)
Andro Melos
Heisei Ultraseven
Saitama (One Punch Man)
The Hero Association
Izuku Midoriya (My Hero Academia)
The Heroes of BNHA
Himitsu Sentai Gorenger (Super Sentai Series)
JAKQ Dengekitai (Super Sentai Series)
Battle Fever J (Super Sentai Series, excluding Miss America I)
Denshi Sentai Denziman (Super Sentai Series)
Taiyou Sentai Sun Vulcan (Super Sentai Series)
Dai Sentai Goggle V (Super Sentai Series)
Kagaku Sentai Dynaman (Super Sentai Series)
Choudenshi Bioman (Super Sentai Series)
Dengeki Sentai Changeman (Super Sentai Series)
Choushinsei Flashman (Super Sentai Series)
Hikari Sentai Maskman (Super Sentai Series)
Choujuu Sentai Liveman (Super Sentai Series)
Kousoku Sentai Turboranger (Super Sentai Series)
Chikyuu Sentai Fiveman (Super Sentai Series)
Chojin Sentai Jetman (Super Sentai Series)
Kyoryu Sentai Zyuranger (Super Sentai Series)
Gosei Sentai Dairanger (Super Sentai Series)
Ninja Sentai Kakuranger (Super Sentai Series)
Chouriki Sentai Ohranger (Super Sentai Series)
Gekisou Sentai Carranger (Super Sentai Series)
Denji Sentai Megaranger (Super Sentai Series)
Seijuu Sentai Gingaman (Super Sentai Series)
Kyukyu Sentai GoGoV (Super Sentai Series)
Mirai Sentai Timeranger (Super Sentai Series)
Hyakujuu Sentai Gaoranger (Super Sentai Series)
Ninpuu Sentai Hurricanger (Super Sentai Series)
Bakuryu Sentai Abaranger (Super Sentai Series)
Tokusou Sentai Dekaranger (Super Sentai Series)
Mahou Sentai Magiranger (Super Sentai Series)
Gogo Sentai Boukenger (Super Sentai Series)
Juken Sentai Gekiranger (Super Sentai Series)
Engine Sentai Go-Onger (Super Sentai Series)
Samurai Sentai Shinkenger (Super Sentai Series)
Tensou Sentai Goseiger (Super Sentai Series)
Kaizoku Sentai Gokaiger (Super Sentai Series)
Tokumei/Dobutsu Sentai Go-Busters (Super Sentai Series)
Zyuden Sentai Kyoryuger (Super Sentai Series)
Ressha Sentai ToQger (Super Sentai Series)
Shuriken Sentai Ninninger (Super Sentai Series)
Doubutsu Sentai Zyuohger (Super Sentai Series)
Uchu Sentai Kyuranger (Super Sentai Series)
Kaitou Sentai Lupinranger VS Keisatsu Sentai Patranger (Super Sentai Series)
Kishiryu Sentai Ryusoulger (Super Sentai Series)
Mashin Sentai Kiramager (Super Sentai Series)
Kikai Sentai Zenkaiger (Super Sentai Series)
Avataro Sentai Donbrothers (Super Sentai Series)
Hikonin Sentai Akibaranger (Unofficial Super Sentai Series)
Space Sheriff Gavan (Metal Hero Series)
Space Sheriff Sharivan (Metal Hero Series)
Space Sheriff Shaider (Metal Hero Series)
MegaBeast Investigator Juspion (Metal Hero Series)
Time-Space Warrior Spielban (Metal Hero Series)
Superhuman-Machine Metalder (Metal Hero Series)
World Ninja War Jiraiya (Metal Hero Series)
The Mobile Cop Jiban (Metal Hero Series)
Special Rescue Police Winspector (Metal Hero Series)
Super Rescue Solbrain (Metal Hero Series)
Special Rescue Exceedraft (Metal Hero Series)
Special Investigation Robot Janperson (Metal Hero Series)
Blue SWAT (Metal Hero Series)
Heavy Shell B-Fighter (Metal Hero Series)
B-Fighter Kabuto (Metal Hero Series)
Kabutack (Metal Hero Series)
Robotack (Metal Hero Series)
Android Kikaider
Kikaider 01
Kikaider Reboot
Android Kikaider (anime)
Inazuman
Moonlight Mask
Seven Color Mask
Prince of Space
National Kid
Iron Sharp/Space Chief from Uchuu Kaisokusen
Akakage
Captain Ultra
Giant Robo
Barom-1
Henshin Ninja Arashi
Robot Detective
Condorman
Akumaizer 3
Space Ironman Kyodain
The Kagestar
Ninja Captor, once confused to be part of the Super Sentai Series. Currently stands on its own.
Chojin Bibyun (Sequel to Akumaizer 3)
Kaiketsu Zubat
Daitetsujin 17 (Read as One Seven)
Nebula Mask Machineman
Brother Fist Byclosser
Masked Beauty Patrine
Lady Battle Cop
Super Shining Soldier Changéríon
Madan Senki Ryukendo (Created by Tomy, considered the zeroeth entry of the Tomica Hero Series)
Tomica Hero Rescue Force (Tomica Hero Series)
Tomica Hero Rescue Fire (Tomica Hero Series)
Battle Hawk
Devilman
Cutie Honey
The Garo Franchise and Series
Super Robot Red Baron
Super Robot Mach Baron
Ganbaron
Aztekaiser
Dinosaur War Izenborg
Dinosaur Corps Koseidon
Gridman the Hyper Agent
SSSS.Gridman
Godman
Greenman
Warrior of Love Rainbowman
Ryūsei Ningen Zone/Zone Fighter
Kure Kure Takora
Enban Sensō Bankid
Megaloman
Computer Police Cybercop
Shichisei Toshin Guyferd
Chouseishin Gransazer (Chouseishin Series)
Genseishin Justirisers (Chouseishin Series)
Chousei Kantai Sazer-X (Chouseishin Series)
Ambassador Magma
Spectreman
Kaiketsu Lion-Maru
Fuun Lion-Maru
Lion-Maru G
Tetsujin Tiger Seven
Denjin Zaborger
Karate-Robo Zaborgar
Super Giant, the first superhero in celluloids and a year earlier than Gekko Kamen/Moonlight Mask
Silver Kamen
Die Silbermaske
Specter
Bio Booster Armor Guyver
Human No. 1, and No. 2 from Assault! Human!!
Fūma no Kojirō
Fireman
Hell Girl
Idol × Warrior Miracle Tunes! (Girls × Heroine Series)
Magical × Heroine Magimajo Pures! (Girls × Heroine Series)
Secret × Heroine Phantomirage! (Girls × Heroine Series)
Police × Heroine Lovepatrina!  (Girls × Heroine Series)
Iron King
Jikuu Keisatsu Wecker Series
Rosetta: The Masked Angel
Shougeki Gouraigan
Dogoo Girl Series
Vanny Knights
Voicelugger
Jumborg Ace
K-tai Investigator 7
Kami no Kiba: Jinga, spinoff of the Garo Series
Zero: Black Blood, another spinoff of the Garo Series
Zero: Dragon Blood, second part to Zero: Black Blood
Karakuri Samurai Sesshaawan 1
Mighty Jack
Mirrorman
Ryujin Mabuyer
Socialite Belle Panchanne: The Wife Is a Superheroine!
Star Wolf
Tekkōki Mikazuki
Thunder Mask
X-Bomber
Legend Hero Samgugjeon
Bouken Rockbat
Iria: Zeiram
Majin Hunter Mitsurugi
Cho Ninjatai Inazuma
Kamen Teacher
Daimajin
UFO Daisensou: Tatakae! Red Tiger
The Toei Fushigi Comedy Series
Sailor Moon and the Sailor Guardians
Mazinger Z
Cyborg 009
009-1
Eight Man
Pretty Cure
Anpanman
Tetsuwan Atom/Mighy Atom/Astro Boy
Uran/Astro Girl
Cobalt/Jetto
Gesicht
Jetter Mars
Casshan/Casshern
Luna Kozuki
Hurricane Polymar
Tekkaman: The Space Knight (Not to be confused with Tekkanman Blade)
Science Ninja Team Gatchaman (Used as a basis for Chojin Sentai Jetman)
Campus Special Investigator Hikaruon (A homage to the Metal Hero Series, specifically the Space Sheriffs)
Karai (TMNT)
Baoh
Concrete Revolutio: Superhuman Phantasmagoria
Gunslinger Stratos
Heroman, created by the late Stan Lee and Bones Inc
K.O. Beast
Karas
Hentai Kamen
Magical Girl Spec-Ops Asuka
Microsuperman / Microid Z
Ratman
The Reflection's chosen individuals
Sailor Victory (not related to Sailor Moon or the Sailor Guardians)
Samurai Flamenco
Shadow Lady
Spawn (Ken Kurosawa)
Spider Man/Yu Komori (manga)
Super HxEros
Tekkaman Blade (Not to be confused with Tekkanman)
Tiger & Bunny
Ultimate Girls (anime series)
Viewtiful Joe
Wonderful 101
Wing-Man
Witchblade (2006 anime adaptation)
Zetman

Taiwanese 
Space Warriors (80's Taiwanese series)
Shadow Shell (Marvel Comics)

Korean
Amadeus Cho (Marvel Comics) 
Ballistic from the Blood Pack
Chance from Fallen Angels
 Dragonson (Ahn Kwang-Jo) from Justice League of China
Element Woman
Eugene Choi (DC Comics)
Linda Park (comics)
Luna Snow (Marvel Comics)
Mystek from Justice League Task Force
Adam Park from the Power Rangers universe
Ray (Lucien Gates)
Seoul from Bloodpool
Third Rail from the Blood Syndicate
Xombi
Silk (Marvel Comics)
Seok-hun from Psychokinesis
White Fox (Marvel Comics)
Raiden Yoon (Marvel Comics)

South Asian

Afghan 

 Dust (Marvel Comics)

Bangladeshi 

 Enigma/Tara Virango (a superhero in Marvel Comics)
 Ikaras (a science fiction superhero novel written by Muhammed Zafar Iqbal)
 Joom (Dhaka Comics)
 Machine man (from the Bangladeshi movie Machine Man)
 Lungiman (parody/comedy character from Dhaka comics)
 Montpellier from DC Comics
 Ibrahim (Dhaka Comics)
 Rishad (Dhaka Comics)
 Bizli (from Bangladeshi film Bizli)
 Electric Man (Bikash present comics)

Indian
Ajooba
Aryamaan – Brahmaand Ka Yodha
Aruna from DC Comics
Astra Force
Athisayan
Baalveer
Baji
Bhavesh Joshi Superhero
Bheriya
Bhokal
Captain Vyom
Celsius
Chakra: The Invincible - An Indian Superhero created by Stan Lee for Liquid Comics
Chitti from Enthiran and 2.0 (film)
Dabung Girl
Devi from Virgin Comics/Liquid Comic
Dinesh Deol
Doga
Drona
Flying Jatt
G.One from Ra.One
Hero from Hero - Bhakti Hi Shakti Hai
Hunterwali
Indra
Inspector Steel
Junior G
Kanthaswamy
Karima Shapandar from the X-Men
Karma
Krrish
Mr. Superman
Maharakshak Aryan
Mask
Maya from Justice League International
Mighty Raju
Minnal Murali
Mr. India
 Mr. X
Mugamoodi
Nagraj
Parmanu
Purple Flame
Raja from Superman (1980 film)
Rama from DC Comics
Giant Man (Raz Malhotra) from Marvel Comics
Sapna (comics) from Marvel Comics
Dharma from the Shadow Cabinet
Plus from the Shadow Cabinet
Shakti
Shakti Haddad from Marvel Comics
Shaktimaan
Shiva from Shiva Ka Insaaf
Solstice from the Teen Titans
Spider-Man: India
Super Commando Dhruva
Super Indian
Supremo
SuperAvni
Super Singh
The Sadhu
Thunderbird (Neal Shaara) from the X-Men
Timeslip (comics) from the New Warriors
Tiranga from Raj Comics
Toofan
Vehaan Arya
Velayudham
Vesper from Marvel UK's Genetix
 Wassi the Vast (Ashok Mohan) from The 99
Yoddha
Yom
Zokkomon
Ravi Shaw, the Blue Beast Morphers Ranger from Power Rangers Beast Morphers

Pakistani
 3 Bahadur
 Super Sohni
 Burka Avenger
Spark
Paak Legion
Stormkiller from FAB Comics
Mobile Jin
Buraak
 Commander Safeguard
 Faiza Hussain from Marvel Comics
Pace from FAB comics
 Ms. Marvel from Marvel Comics
Winglord from FAB Comics
 Nastoor from Ainak Wala Jin
 DarkLion from FAB Comics

Sri Lankan
 Suvik Senyaka Mutant member of the Acolytes

Southeast Asian

Cambodian
OMAC (Kevin Kho) from the Justice League International

Filipino

Bagwis
Batang X, a superhero team movie of 1995
Bayan Knights
Biotrog
Boy Pinoy
Buhawi Jack
Captain Barbell
Captain Philippines
Commander Steel (Earth-2) from DC Comics
Combatron
Darna
Dragonna
Fantastic Man
Fantastikids
Flash Bomba
Gagambino
Gagamboy, protagonist of a 2004 Filipino film
Grail from Wetworks
Hagibis
Ipo-ipo
Joaquin Bordado
Juan dela Cruz
Kapitan Boom
Kamandag
Kidlat
Krystala
Kung Fu Kids
Lagim
Lastikman 
Ang Panday
Olen
Patintina
Pedro Penduko
Pepeng Agimat
Sandugo, a superhero team
Siopawman
Sipatos
Super B
Super Inggo
Super Islaw
Super Twins
Tiny Tony
Triumph Division from Marvel Comics
Varga
Volta
Wapakman
Wave (Marvel Comics)
 Widad the Loving (Hope Mendoza) of the 99
Zsazsa Zaturnnah
Zaido: the Space Sherriffs, a spinoff of the Metal Hero Series
Lucas Kendall, the Blue Time Force Ranger from Power Rangers Time Force
Alyssa Enrilé, the White Wild Force Ranger from Power Rangers Wild Force

Indonesian
 :id:Aquanus 
 Cascade from Global Guardians by DC Comics
 :id:Bima Satria Garuda
 :id:Caroq
 :id:Garuda Superhero
 :id:Gundala (pahlawan super)
 :id:Godam (komik)
 :id:Godam Reborn
 :id:Gatot kaca
 :id:Hiro Pembela Bumi
 :id:Jin Kartubi
 :id:Kalong
 :id:Kapten Halilintar
 Melati Kusuma/:id:Komodo (comics) from Marvel Comics
 :id:Maza
 :id:Merpati
 :id:Panji Manusia Millenium
 :id:Pangeran Mlaar
 :id:Saras 008
 :id:Sembrani (komik)
 :id:Si Buta Dari Gua Hantu
 :id:Sri Asih
 :id:Wiro Sableng

Thailand
Chad Lee, the Blue Lightspeed Ranger from Power Rangers Lightspeed Rescue
Antonio Garcia, the Gold Samurai Ranger from Power Rangers Samurai*
Mercury Man

Vietnamese
Karma (comics) member of the New Mutants
Xi'an from X-Men 2099
Artemis Crock from DC Comics
Green Lantern (Tai Pham) from DC Comics
Trini Kwan, the original Yellow Ranger from Mighty Morphin Power Rangers
Mighty Guardians

Malaysian
Cicak Man, the protagonist of a 2006,2008 and 2015 Malaysian film
Keluang Man
Boboiboy
Munira Khairuddin, from DC Comics
Cameron Watanabe, the Green Samurai Ranger from Power Rangers Ninja Storm
Sunbird

Singaporean
Jenny Quantum from The Authority
Ghost-Maker (Minhkhoa Khan), from DC Comics, anti-hero and ally of Batman

West Asian

Iranian
Sirocco (Iranian superhero and ally of Superman)
Super-Shayk (Iranian superhero introduced in 52 #12)

Iraqi
Aminedi
Black Raazer 
Sirocco 
Veil

Israeli
Hayoth (superhero team)
Seraph (Israeli member of the Global Guardians)
Sabra

Lebanese
 Green Lantern (Simon Baz; Lebanese-American)

Palestinian
Iron Butterfly (Kahina Eskandari)

Saudi Arabian
Archer of Arabia (Green Arrows of the World)
Naif al-Sheikh (former member of Justice League Elite)

Syrian
Sandstorm (member of the Global Guardians)
 Silver Scorpion (Bashir Bari) from Liquid Comics

Turkish
Janissary (Selma Tolon, a sorceress and heroine, has the mystical scimitar of Suleiman the Magnificent)

Afro-Asian, Eurasian and other mixed ancestry examples
Akihiro, also known as Daken, Wolverine and Fang (Japanese and Canadian)
Artemis (from the Young Justice animated series) (Vietnamese and European descent)
Captain Flamingo (Japanese and Canadian)
Cassandra Cain (variously known as Batgirl, Black Bat and Orphan) (Chinese and European descent)
Deep Blue from DC Comics (Japanese and European descent)
Fever from the Doom Patrol
Gehenna Hewitt, supporting character from DC Comics' Firestorm comic book series (Vietnamese and European descent)
Green Arrow (Connor Hawke) (Korean, African-American and European descent)
Grunge
Carol and Jane Kent from Superman: Secret Identity (Indian-American and Kryptonian)
Karate Kid (Japanese and European descent)
Kid Flash (a.k.a. Impulse) (Korean-American and European descent)
Kid Kaiju
Ladybug (Chinese and French)
Mandarin (Chinese and English) 
Mantis (Vietnamese and German) 
Meanstreak from X-Men 2099
Mongrel from DC Comics (Cambodian and African American)
Ravager (Rose Wilson) (Cambodian and European descent)
Red Hood (Lian Harper), daughter of Arsenal and Cheshire 
Red Arrow (Emiko Queen), daughter of Robert Queen and Shado (Japanese and European descent)
Shi (Japanese and European descent)
Silhouette from New Warriors (Cambodian and African-American) 
Skye / Quake (from Agents of S.H.I.E.L.D.) (Chinese and European descent)
Smasher from Dynamo 5
Traci Thirteen (Chinese and European descent)
Thunder and Lightning (Vietnamese and European descent)
Colleen Wing (Japanese, Chinese and European descent)
Damian Wayne, son of Bruce Wayne and Talia al Ghul, (Chinese, Arab and European descent)
Ashley Hammond, the Yellow Turbo and Space Ranger from Power Rangers Turbo, and Power Rangers In Space
Nick Russel, the Red Mystic Ranger from Power Rangers Mystic Force
Rose Ortiz, the Pink Overdrive Ranger from Power Rangers Operation Overdrive
Theo Martin, the Blue Jungle Fury Ranger from Power Rangers Jungle Fury
Gem, designated as Ranger Gold from Power Rangers RPM
Mia Watanabe, the Pink Samurai Ranger from Power Rangers Samurai, (not related to Cameron Watanabe)
Troy Burrows, the Red Megaforce Ranger from Power Rangers Megaforce
Koda, the Blue Dino Charge Ranger from Power Rangers Dino Charge
Brody Romero, the first Red Ninja Steel Ranger from Power Rangers Ninja Steel, (the main red of the Super/Ninja Steel)
Preston Tien, the Blue Ninja Steel Ranger from Power Rangers Ninja Steel
Dane Romero, another Red Ninja Steel Ranger from Power Rangers Ninja Steel, (he appeared first but was the third to appear with his own suit)
Levi Weston/Aiden Romero, the Gold Ninja Steel Ranger from Power Rangers Ninja Steel
Kimberly Hart, as the Pink Ranger from Power Rangers (2017)
Zack Taylor, as the Black Ranger from Power Rangers (2017)

Other Asian characters
Ajak from Eternals (Siberian in the comics. Lebanese in the film)
Batman (Terry McGinnis) (Asian and Irish descent in Batman: Beyond the White Knight)
Eugene Choi, member of the Shazam Family
Gilgamesh from Eternals (Iraqi in the comics. Korean in the film)
Hat from The Elite
Invincible from Invincible (Half Korean in the television series)
Jade (Jennifer Rice)
Kamal El Alaoui (Mutant) member of the Acolytes in the comics, portrayed as an Asian member of the Future X-Men in Wolverine and the X-Men
Kingo from Eternals (Japanese in the comics. Indian in the film, played by Pakistani-American actor Kumail Nanjiani)
Sersi from Eternals (Greek in the comics. Chinese in the films)
Wonder Woman from the DC Extended Universe. Played by Israeli actress Gal Gadot.

References

Asian superheroes
Asian
Superheroes
Superheroes